Umiamako Glacier, is a glacier in Avannaata, Greenland.

Geography
It is a marine terminating glacier outlet of the Greenland Ice Sheet. Its terminus is in the Karrat Fjord, Nordost Bay, Baffin Bay, North Atlantic Ocean. 

The Umiamako Glacier flows roughly southwestwards, bending to an almost north–south direction shortly before its terminus. It is surrounded by some of the highest mountains in west Greenland.

See also
List of glaciers in Greenland

References

Glaciers of Greenland